Grand Prince Changnyeong (Hangul: 창녕대군, Hanja: 昌寧大君; 18 June 1500 - 10 October 1506), his personal name was Yi Seong (Hangul: 이성, Hanja: 李誠) was a Korean Royal Prince as the fourth son (formally as second son) of Yeonsangun of Joseon and Deposed Queen Shin of the Geochang Sin clan.

References

1500 births
1506 deaths
15th-century Korean people
Korean princes
House of Yi
Royalty and nobility who died as children
16th-century Korean people